The 2009 Belgian GP2 round was the seventh race of the 2009 GP2 Series season. It was held on 29 August and 30, 2009 at Circuit de Spa-Francorchamps near the village of Francorchamps, Wallonia, Belgium. The race was used as a support race to the 2009 Belgian Grand Prix.

Report

Background 
PartyPokerRacing.com Scuderia Coloni, along with their drivers Andreas Zuber and Luiz Razia, were forced to miss the round due to unresolved financial disputes.

Qualifying 
Álvaro Parente achieved the first pole position in his GP2 Series career, and also recorded the first pole for his team Ocean Racing Technology.

Feature Race 
The start of the race was delayed by 15 minutes due to a serious accident at the depot when Davide Rigon's car number one mechanic, 57-year-old Trident Racing team mechanic Vasco Rossi, was injured when a wheel gun was left in the path of Ricardo Teixeira's car as he was leaving the pits to join the dummy grid, causing the air hose to get caught by the rear wheel and dragging a metal beam down on to Rossi's head.

Parente won the 100th race in GP2 history — again the first for his team — and the second of his career.

Classification

Qualifying

Lucas di Grassi was issued a 3 place grid-penalty for impeding Karun Chandhok.
Franck Perera did not participate in either race, as he qualified outside 107% of Álvaro Parente's pole position time, and was not within the same rule during free practice.

Feature Race

 Diego Nunes, Dani Clos and Nelson Panciatici were given 25-second time penalties by the race stewards as a result of various incidents during the feature race.

Sprint Race

Standings after the round 

Drivers' Championship standings

Teams' Championship standings

 Note: Only the top five positions are included for both sets of standings.

References

Gp2 Round, 2009
Spa-Francorchamps